Vallichlora is a genus of butterflies belonging to the family Geometridae.

Species:

Vallichlora rara 
Vallichlora selva

References

Further reading
 Viidalepp, J. & Lindt, A. 2019. A new Neotropical emerald moth genus based on some unusual "artefacts" (Lepidoptera: Geometridae, Geometrinae). Zootaxa 4691 (2): 181–187. DOI: 10.11646/zootaxa.4691.2.8

Geometridae
Butterfly genera